The 1984 Cal State Hayward Pioneers football team represented California State University, Hayward—now known as California State University, East Bay—as a member of the Northern California Athletic Conference (NCAC) during the 1984 NCAA Division II football season. Led by tenth-year head coach Tim Tierney, Cal State Hayward compiled an overall record of 7–3 with a mark of 4–2 in conference play, placing third in the NCAC. The team outscored its opponents 260 to 175 for the season. The Pioneers played home games at Pioneer Stadium in Hayward, California.

Schedule

Notes

References

Cal State Hayward
Cal State Hayward Pioneers football seasons
Cal State Hayward Pioneers football